Raj Kumar Gupta ( – 11 February 2020) was an Indian politician from Punjab belonging to Indian National Congress. He was a legislator of the Punjab Legislative Assembly. He also served as the chairman of Punjab Small Industries and Export Corporation.

Biography
Gupta was elected as a member of the Punjab Legislative Assembly from Jullundur Central in 2002. He was not nominated from Indian National Congress in 2007. After this incident he joined Bharatiya Janata Party. He returned to Indian National Congress in 2010.

Gupta died on 11 February 2020 at the age of 85.

References

2020 deaths
Indian National Congress politicians from Punjab, India
Bharatiya Janata Party politicians from Punjab
Punjab, India MLAs 2002–2007
1930s births
People from Jalandhar district